The slender snipefish or snipefish (Macroramphosus gracilis) is a snipefish of the genus Macroramphosus.

References

 
 Tony Ayling & Geoffrey Cox, Collins Guide to the Sea Fishes of New Zealand,  (William Collins Publishers Ltd, Auckland, New Zealand 1982) 

Centriscidae
Taxa named by Richard Thomas Lowe
Fish described in 1839